Janardan Ganpatrao Negi (1 August 1936 – 9 November 2016) was an Indian theoretical geophysicist and emeritus scientist at National Geophysical Research Institute. He is known for his studies on geoelectromagnetics and geomagnetism and is an elected fellow of the Royal Astronomical Society, London and the National Academy of Sciences, India. The Council of Scientific and Industrial Research, the apex agency of the Government of India for scientific research, awarded him the Shanti Swarup Bhatnagar Prize for Science and Technology, one of the highest Indian science awards for his contributions to Earth, Atmosphere, Ocean and Planetary Sciences in 1980.

Biography 

J. G. Negi, born on 1 August 1936 in the tribal village of Khidhgaon of Khandwa district East Nimar in the Indian state of Madhya pradesh to Ganpatrao and Laxmi Devi, completed his graduate studies in science at Victoria College (present-day MLB  Government College of Excellence) in 1956 before obtaining a master's degree from Dan Singh Bisht Government College, Nainital in 1958. His academic career started at Holkar Science College of Jiwaji University as a lecturer where he worked from 1958 to 1959 during which time he enrolled at the Indian Institute of Technology, Kharagpur for his doctoral studies and secured a PhD in 1962. He continued at IIT Kharagpur for two more years as a research scholar and joined National Geophysical Research Institute, Hyderabad in 1964 as a senior scientific officer. He spent the rest of his official career at NGRI, serving in such various positions as assistant director (1971–79), senior assistant director (1979–82), deputy director (1982–83), senior deputy director (1983–90) and director grade scientist to superannuate from service in 1996 as the director. Post retirement, he serves as an emeritus scientist of the institute.

Negi's theoretical studies have been focusing on the areas of geoelectromagnetics and geomagnetism of geophysics and his researches have assisted in the wider understanding of gravity, heat flow and electromagnetic fields of Earth's surface. His studies have been detailed in a book, Anisotropy in Geoelectromagnetism, as chapters in books by others, and as several peer reviewed articles and his work has been cited by many authors. He headed the Madhya Pradesh Council of Science and Technology as its director general and served as the scientific advisor to the Government of Madhya Pradesh for two terms during 1992–94 and 2005–06. When the Institute of Seismological Research, Gandhinagar was established in 2003, he served as the founder director general of the institution till 2005. He is a former UNESCO lecturer and a visiting faculty at many universities including Cooperative Institute for Research in Environmental Sciences, Federal University of Bahia and Federal University of Pará.

Negi is married to Asha Billore and the couple has two sons, Atul and Madhav.

Awards and honors 
Negi received the Krishnan Medal of the Indian Geophysical Union in 1974. The Council of Scientific and Industrial Research awarded him the Shanti Swarup Bhatnagar Prize, one of the highest Indian science awards, in 1980. A life fellow of the Royal Astronomical Society, he was elected as a fellow by the National Academy of Sciences, India in 1984, the same year as he received the National Lectureship of the University Grants Commission of India. He is also a recipient of the Holkar Science College Centenary Award, Vigyan Ratna and the 1991 Lifetime Achievement Award of the Association of Exploration Geophysicists. The award orations delivered by him include the Dr. H. N. Siddique Memorial Lecture of the Indian Geophysical Union in 2003.

Selected bibliography

Books

Chapters

Articles

See also 
 Geomagnetism

Notes

References

External links 
 

Recipients of the Shanti Swarup Bhatnagar Award in Earth, Atmosphere, Ocean & Planetary Sciences
1936 births
Indian scientific authors
20th-century Indian geologists
IIT Kharagpur alumni
Scientists from Maharashtra
Indian geophysicists
Jiwaji University alumni
Fellows of the Royal Astronomical Society
Fellows of The National Academy of Sciences, India
Living people
People from Chandrapur district